Lactaldehyde is an intermediate in the methylglyoxal metabolic pathway. Methylglyoxal is converted to D-lactaldehyde by glycerol dehydrogenase (gldA).  Lactaldehyde is then oxidized to lactic acid by aldehyde dehydrogenase.

Structure 
Lactaldehyde is a three-carbon atom species with a carbonyl group on the first carbon atom (making it an aldehyde), and a hydroxy group on the second carbon atom, making it a secondary alcohol.  The molecule is chiral, its stereocenter being located on the second carbon atom.

Lactaldehyde exists in several forms: in open-chain form and as cyclic hemiacetal; in solution and in crystal forms; as monomer and as dimer.  In crystal form, three conformers occur as hemiacetal dimers with a 1,4-dioxane ring skeleton:

In equilibrium solution, negligibly small amounts of the monomer and at least one five-membered ring dimer exist.

References

Hydroxy aldehydes
Secondary alcohols